Tracy Jean Ducar (born June 18, 1973) is an American soccer goalkeeper who previously played for the United States women's national soccer team and the Boston Breakers in the Women's United Soccer Association.

Early life
Ducar was born in Lawrence, Massachusetts and began her athletic career at North Andover High School. She played both basketball and soccer, however, her second year she injured her back and needed surgery for two vertebrae to be fused together.  Ducar was not able to play her junior year of soccer, and her soccer coach thought she was never going to be able to play again.  However, Ducar proved her coach wrong, and led North Andover's women's soccer team to a Cape Ann League Title.

University of North Carolina
Ducar attended and played goalkeeper for the University of North Carolina. She graduated in 1995 with a degree in biology and a minor in chemistry. She was also inducted into Phi Beta Kappa. In the 1994 NCSS Tournament, Ducar played every minute in every game, and University of North Carolina won the National Championship.  Ducar had complete shutouts both in the semi-final and final games.

Ducar was nominated for the 1995 Missouri Athletic Club Player of the Year.  She was named All-American, captain, Most Valuable Player, (M.V.P.), and led U.N.C. with a record of 23–0–0 in 1995.

Playing career

Club
In 2000, Ducar became one of the twenty founding players of the Women's United Soccer Association, (WUSA), the first official professional women's soccer league in the United States.  From 2000 to 2001, Ducar played for the Boston Breakers. In 2001, Ducar was awarded the Boston Breaker's Shield Award.

Previously, during the summer of 1998, Ducar played for the Raleigh Wings. In 1999, Ducar played again for the Wings and led the team to a win in the W-League Championship.

International
Ducar's first appearance on the United States women's national soccer team was on January 16, 1996 vs. Brazil in Campinas, Brazil. Ducar picked up two more caps, (games played against international competition), in Melbourne on February 28, 1996 and in Bathurst on March 3, 1996. Ducar managed her first shutout on January 28, 1996 vs. the Ukraine. Then in 1997, during the Nike Victory Tournament, Ducar split time in every game with Briana Scurry, (the starting goal keeper for the U.S. National Team), and also in the Women's World Cup in 1997.

One of Ducar's most shining moments was during the U.S. vs. Salzgitter, Germany.  A substitution was made by the U.S., replacing Scurry with Ducar.  Ducar had made four big saves to keep the shut out.  In 1997, Ducar had made twelve overall appearances for the national team, while starting in three of them.  In 1998, Ducar played in six matches for the national team and while starting in each one, had four shutouts, and allowed only two goals.  That same year, the team won the Goodwill Games.  During the 1999 FIFA Women's World Cup, Ducar represented the U.S. as one of the two back-up goalkeepers.

Coaching career
From 1999 to 2000, Ducar was goalkeeper coach and recruiting coordinator at the University of North Carolina at Greensboro.

In 2004, Ducar was named the women's head soccer coach at Greensboro College. Ducar and her husband, Chris Ducar, (the women's goalkeeper coach at the University of North Carolina), live together in Durham, North Carolina and run soccer camps, clinics, and private teaching sessions together.

See also
 United States women's national soccer team
 Boston Breakers (WUSA)

References

External links
 Tracy Ducar bio
 Tracy Ducar profile

Living people
1973 births
North Carolina Tar Heels women's soccer players
American women's soccer players
Boston Breakers (WUSA) players
United States women's international soccer players
Women's United Soccer Association players
Soccer players from Massachusetts
1999 FIFA Women's World Cup players
FIFA Women's World Cup-winning players
UNC Greensboro Spartans women's soccer coaches
Women's association football goalkeepers
American soccer coaches
Raleigh Wings players
USL W-League (1995–2015) players